Polog is a populated settlement in the Mostar municipality, Herzegovina-Neretva Canton, Federation of Bosnia and Herzegovina, Bosnia and Herzegovina.

History
In 1991, the residents of Polog stopped a column of tanks of the Yugoslav People's Army (JNA).

Demographics 
According to the 2013 census, its population was 974.

References

Populated places in Mostar
Villages in the Federation of Bosnia and Herzegovina